Gorno Crnilište is a village in the municipality of Sveti Nikole, North Macedonia.

Demographics
As of the 2021 census, Gorno Crnilište had 373 residents with the following ethnic composition:
Macedonians 357
Persons for whom data are taken from administrative sources 16

According to the 2002 census, the village had a total of 345 inhabitants. Ethnic groups in the village include:
Macedonians 345

References

Villages in Sveti Nikole Municipality